The men's light heavyweight boxing competition at the 2016 Summer Olympics in Rio de Janeiro was held from 6 to 18 August at the Riocentro.

Schedule 
All times are Brasília Time (UTC−3).

Results

Finals

Top half

1 Saada was ejected from the competition after he was arrested for sexual assault the day before the opening ceremony.

Bottom half

References

Boxing at the 2016 Summer Olympics
Men's events at the 2016 Summer Olympics